Leptospermum obovatum, commonly known as river teatree, is a species of shrub that is endemic to south-eastern continental Australia. It has egg-shaped or lance-shaped leaves that are narrower at the base, white flowers usually arranged singly on short side shoots and fruit that remains on the plant until it dies.

Description
The flowers are borne singly, sometimes in pairs on short side shoots. Flowering mainly occurs from November to January and the fruit is a broadly hemispherical capsule  in diameter and that remains on the plant until it dies, the sepal remnants having fallen.

Taxonomy and naming
Leptospermum obovatum was first formally described by in 1827 Robert Sweet in his book Flora Australasica. The specific epithet (obovatum) is a Latin word meaning "obovate".

Distribution and habitat
River teatree grows among rocks, near swift-flowing streams and often in swampy places. It is found on the Southern Tablelands and South Coast of New South Wales and is widespread in southern Victoria.

Use in horticulture
This species can be grown from seed or from cuttings and is hardy in cultivation. It will grow in heavy shade, is frost hardy, and a useful screening plant.

References

obovatum
Myrtales of Australia
Flora of New South Wales
Flora of Victoria (Australia)
Plants described in 1827